Timo Uster (born 22 October 1974 in Berlin) is a Gambian footballer who last played for Rot-Weiß Oberhausen.

International career 
Uster played two caps for the Gambian national football team in 2007.

Personal life 
He also holds German citizenship.

References 

1974 births
Living people
People with acquired Gambian citizenship
Gambian footballers
The Gambia international footballers
German footballers
German people of Gambian descent
German sportspeople of African descent
SV Meppen players
FC Carl Zeiss Jena players
SV Wehen Wiesbaden players
SV Darmstadt 98 players
Rot-Weiß Oberhausen players
Footballers from Berlin
2. Bundesliga players
Association football defenders